Singles 93–03 is a compilation album by English electronic music duo The Chemical Brothers, released on 22 September 2003. It is a collection of singles from the duo between 1993 and 2003 (though not all the singles are included), plus two new songs "Get Yourself High" and "The Golden Path". Early copies of the CD came with a bonus CD. It was certified gold by the BPI on 24 October 2003.

"Otter Rock", which is featured on the bonus disc as a previously unreleased song, also appears on The Big Noise (a charity CD released in The Guardian for Oxfam).

Singles 

"The Golden Path" was released on 15 September 2003 as the first single from the album. It reached number 17 in the UK charts. "Get Yourself High" was the second single from the album, released on 8 December 2003. It was not eligible for the UK charts because it had five songs instead of three songs, which is required for qualification.

Track listing 

Many of the songs are edited, even if only by roughly 10 seconds.

Bonus disc 

A bonus disc was included with early copies of the CD. It features B-sides, previously unreleased material, EP tracks, remixes, and live tracks.

DVD 

 "Life Is Sweet" 
 "Setting Sun" 
 "Block Rockin' Beats" 
 "Elektrobank" 
 "Hey Boy Hey Girl" 
 "Let Forever Be" 
 "Out of Control" 
 "Star Guitar" 
 "The Test" 
 "The Golden Path" 

DVD extras

 "Hey Boy Hey Girl (Live from Red Rocks 1999)" 
 "Hoops (Live from Fuji Rock Festival 2002)" 
 "Setting Sun (Live from Fuji Rock Festival 2002)" 
 "Temptation/Star Guitar (Live from Fuji Rock Festival 2002)" 
 "Chemical Beats (Live from Glastonbury 1997)" 
 "The Private Psychedelic Reel (Live from Glastonbury 2000)" 
 Interviews with The Chemical Brothers, Richard Ashcroft, Norman Cook, Wayne Coyne, Noel Gallagher, Beth Orton, Justin Robertson, Sean Rowley and Bernard Sumner.
 "The Private Reels"

The album was repackaged with its original bonus disc and corresponding DVD and re-issued on Monday 26 November 2007.

Charts

Weekly charts

Year-end charts

Certifications

References 

2003 greatest hits albums
The Chemical Brothers albums
Astralwerks compilation albums
2003 video albums
Music video compilation albums
Astralwerks video albums
Virgin Records compilation albums
Virgin Records video albums